Us and Our Education is a 2009 British documentary film written and produced by Eve Jones and directed by Chris Burns. It explores learning disabilities within schools and in the work place by centering on weekly workshops that were to be used as the basis to a theatre performance by several day centers in Worcestershire.

References

External links
 
 

2009 films
2009 documentary films
Documentary films about adolescence
British documentary films
2000s English-language films
2000s British films